The Coupe Gambardella is a French football cup competition held between the under-18s of the French football clubs, organized by the French Football Federation (FFF).

The cup is regarded as an opportunity for young hopefuls to showcase their skills in a national competition. A victory in the finals of the cup is as highly sought by players trying to start their career, as by clubs wishing to demonstrate their ability to train young talents.

The current champion is Olympique Lyonnais having defeated Caen in the 2022 final by a score of 5–3 in the penalty shootout after a 1–1 draw during regular time. The 2019–20 and 2020–21 editions of the tournament were cancelled because of the COVID-19 pandemic in France.

History
The tournament is the modern day version of the Coupe nationale des juniors, which ran up until 1954. The competition was then renamed, in 1955, to honour Emmanuel Gambardella, president of the French Football Federation from 1949 to 1953, who died on 30 August 1953.

Format
The Coupe Gambardella begins in December, of the previous year of the final, at the regional level. Home advantage is given out randomly, until the semi-final stage when games are played at neutral venues. Games which are drawn after ninety minutes, go to a penalty shootout as opposed to extra time and then a shootout. The final is always played on the same day as the Coupe de France and have traditionally taken place at the Stade de France.

List of finals

Results by team
Teams shown in italics are no longer in existence.

References

Coupe Gambardella
Football cup competitions in France
Youth football in France
Youth football competitions